Several special routes of U.S. Route 64 exist. In order from west to east they are as follows.

Alternate routes

Spring Hope alternate route

U.S. Route 64 Alternate (US 64 Alt) was established in 1979, replacing the old mainline US 64 through the town of Spring Hope.

Rocky Mount–Tarboro alternate route

U.S. Route 64 Alternate (US 64 Alt) was established in 1987, replacing the old mainline US 64 between the cities Rocky Mount and Tarboro.

Princeville–Williamston alternate route

U.S. Route 64 Alternate (US 64 Alt) was established in 1996, replacing the old mainline US 64 between the cities Princeville and Williamston.  At some locations it is signed as US 64A.

Business loops and spurs

Farmington business loop

U.S. Route 64 Business (US 64 Bus.) goes through downtown Farmington, via Main Street and Broadway Avenue.  Mainline US 64 is signed as both Bypass and Truck route, going south around Farmington, via Murray Drive.

Muskogee business loop

U.S. Route 64 Business (US-64 Bus.) was established in 1960, replacing the old mainline US-64 through downtown Muskogee, via Okmulgee Avenue and South Main Street. It also has an overlap with U.S. Route 62 Business along Okmulgee Avenue.

Alma business route

U.S. Route 64 Business (Hwy. 64B or US 64B) is an east–west highway in Alma. The route connects US 64 to Highway 162 along a former alignment of US 64 in the city. The route was designated by the Arkansas State Highway Commission on July 28, 1965.

Major intersections

Vilonia business loop

U.S. Route 64 Business (US 64B) was established October 11, 2011, following the former alignment of US 64.  It traverses through downtown Vilonia, via Main Street.

Augusta business loop

U.S. Route 64 Business (US 64B) was established on May 9, 1956, following the former alignment of US 64.  It traverses through downtown Augusta, via 5th Street, Magnolia Street, 3rd Street, and Main Street.

Patterson–McCrory business route

U.S. Route 64 Business (US 64B) was established in 1968, it goes through Patterson and McCrory.

Wynne business loop

U.S. Route 64 Business (US 64B) starts from US 64 and goes west into downtown Wynne, ending at Falls Boulevard.  It does not reconnect to US 64, making it a business spur; not to be confused with US 64 Spur, located northwest of Wynne.

Parkin business route

U.S. Route 64 Business (US 64B) was established in 1972, it starts from US 64 and goes west into downtown Parkin, ending at Church Street.  It does not reconnect to US 64, making it a business spur.

Earle business loop

U.S. Route 64 Business (US 64B) was established in 1972, it goes through downtown Earle, via 2nd Street.

Crawfordsville business loop

U.S. Route 64 Business (US 64B) was established in 1972, it goes through downtown Crawfordsville, via Main Street.

Whiteville business loop

U.S. Route 64 Business (US 64 Bus.) was established in 1963, it goes through downtown Whiteville, via Main Street.

Selmer business loop

U.S. Route 64 Business (US 64 Bus.) is a former section of US 64 that runs along West Cherry Avenue, Court Avenue and Mulberry Avenue in downtown Selmer, between the two ends of an overlap of US 45 and 64.

Lawrenceburg business route

U.S. Route 64 Business (US 64 Bus.) was established during the mid-2010s as a replacement for mainline US 64's realignment onto the Lawrenceburg Highway. It goes through downtown Lawrenceburg, via West Gaines Street, East Gaines Street and Pulaski Highway.

Winchester business route

U.S. Route 64 Business (US 64 Bus.) in Winchester serves as a replacement for the former alignment of US 64 through the southwest side of the town. It terminates at U.S. Route 41A at the Winchester town square. The highway is signed as US 64 Bus. on the route and is concurrent with SR 50 for its entire length, along with the unsigned concurrencies of SR 15 and SR 16.

Hayesville business loop

U.S. Route 64 Business (US 64 Bus) was established in 1971 when mainline US 64 was placed on new bypass south of Hayesville.  The business routes follows the old alignment through the downtown area, via Hwy 64 Business, Hiwassee Street and Main Street.

Brevard business loop

U.S. Route 64 Business (US 64 Bus.) was established in 1960 as a renumbering of US 64A in downtown Brevard, via Caldwell Street.  The  business loop appears only in NCDOT and AASHTO logs and maps; its actually utilized as westbound US 64 and southbound US 276 (between Main Street and Broad Street).  In 2006, NCDOT submitted a request to officially make US 64E and US 64W through downtown Brevard, but was denied in the AASHTO Fall Meeting.

Morganton business loop

U.S. Route 64 Business (US 64 Bus) was established in 1960, which followed the old mainline US 64 routing through downtown Morganton before 1956, via Burkemont Avenue, Union Street and Meeting Street.  Between 1969 and 1972, US 64 Bus was split into one-way alignments, eastbound continued on Meeting Street while westbound moved onto Union Street.  In 1992, a few years after US 64 was rerouted through Lenoir, US 64 Bus was removed east of Green Street along Meeting and Union Streets to Fleming Drive.  Eastbound went north on Green Street to Avery Avenue and westbound went south from Sterling Street to Union Street.  Continuing along Avery Avenue and Lenoir Road, it reconnects with mainline US 64, via Sanford Drive.  This new alignment adds a short overlap with NC 181 and a long overlap with NC 18; its older section west of Green Street continued to share a short overlap with US 70 Bus.

Asheboro business loop

U.S. Route 64 Business (US 64 Bus) was established in 2020 when mainline US 64 was placed on a new freeway bypass south of Asheboro.  The business route continues along the former mainline alignment through the city limits.

Pittsboro business loop

U.S. Route 64 Business (US 64 Bus) was established in 2005 when mainline US 64 was placed on new freeway bypass north of Pittsboro.  The business route continues along the former mainline alignment through the downtown area, via East and West Streets.  At center is the county courthouse, surrounded by a roundabout.

Raleigh–Zebulon business loop

U.S. Route 64 Business (US 64 Bus) was established in 1960 when mainline US 64 was placed on new bypass route north of Wendell, through Lizard Lick; the  business route travels through downtown Wendell along Wendell boulevard, connecting with NC 231 (Selma Road).  In 1975, mainline US 64 was placed on new freeway bypass north of Wendell and Zebulon, extending the business route an additional , from near Eagle Rock to north of Zebulon (via Gannon and Arendell Avenues); the former bypass through Lizard Lick became NC 97.  In 2006, US 64/US 264 was placed on new freeway bypass south of Knightdale; its old alignment becoming another extension of US 64 business, via New Bern Avenue / Knightdale Boulevard and a  hidden concurrency along the Cliff Benson Beltline.

Nashville business loop

U.S. Route 64 Business (US 64 Bus) was established in 1963 when mainline US 64 was placed on new freeway bypass route north of Nashville.  The business route follows the old alignment through the downtown area via Western Avenue, Barnes Street, Washington Street, and Eastern Avenue.

Rocky Mount business loop

U.S. Route 64 Business (US 64 Bus.) was established in 1982, it replaced the old mainline US 64 through downtown Rocky Mount, via Sunset Avenue, Thomas Avenue, and Raleigh Street.

Jamesville business loop

U.S. Route 64 Business (US 64 Bus.) was established in 1992, it replaced the old mainline US 64 through downtown Jamesville, via Main Street.

Columbia business loop

U.S. Route 64 Business (US 64 Bus.) was established in 1960, the business loop goes through downtown Columbia, via Broad Street and Main Street.

Bypass routes

Fayetteville bypass

U.S. Route 64 Bypass (US 64 Byp.) runs along the southern side of Fayetteville, Tennessee. The first section is named Wilson Parkway and runs south, then curves to the southeast. After the intersection with Hedgecomb Avenue and River Drive, the road makes a sharp curve to the northeast where it runs along the west bank of the Elk River. At the intersection with US 431, an overlap with US 231 ends as it joins US 64 Bypass onto a new road named Thornton Taylor Parkway. After passing the Lincoln Medical Center, the road curves from the northeast to northwest as US 64 Bypass ends at US 64, while US 231 continues northward along Thornton Taylor Parkway towards Shelbyville Highway.

Cleveland bypass

U.S. Route 64 Bypass (US 64 Byp.) was constructed as the southeastern part of the Cleveland beltway, known as APD-40. The route is part of Corridor K of the Appalachian Development Highway System.

Manns Harbor–Manteo bypass

U.S. Route 64 Bypass (US 64 Byp.) was established in 1999 as a new primary routing bypassing Manns Harbor and Manteo, while also providing direct access between Nags Head and the mainland.  Its main feature is the Virginia Dare Memorial Bridge, which is a divided four-lane bridge crossing over the Croatan Sound.  From 1999 to 2003, it also shared a complete concurrency with US 264 Bypass.

Spur routes

Wynne spur route

U.S. Route 64 Spur (US 64S) is a north–south spur route in Wynne. The highway serves as an alternate north–south highway to Highway 1 between a residential section of Wynne and US 64. The highway was created for access to an industrial park at the request of City of Wynne officials in 1985.

Route description

The highway begins at an intersection with US 64 and Highway 1 in northern Wynne in the Arkansas Delta. It runs due south as a section line road through an industrial and agricultural area to John Brown Road, where state maintenance ends. The roadway continues south under city maintenance as Martin Luther King Street.

Major intersections

Truck routes

Franklin–Hendersonville truck route

Signage is not primary, US 64 Truck signs are typically located on the side of major junction changes indicating direction of route. Tractor-trailer trucks are prohibited to use mainline US 64 between Franklin and Brevard.

Savannah truck route

U.S. Route 64 Truck (US 64 Truck), also known as, Savannah Truck Route follows Water Street around downtown Savannah, Tennessee.

Former alternate routes

Brevard alternate route

U.S. Route 64 Alternate (US 64A) was established in 1943, as a new primary routing in downtown Brevard, via Caldwell Street.  In 1960 it was renumbered to US 64 Business.

Bat Cave–Morganton alternate route

U.S. Route 64 Alternate (US 64A) was established in 1934 as an alternate route from Bat Cave, in concurrency with US 74, to Ruth, then north to Morganton, replacing NC 181.  In 1948 the route became mainline US 64.

Statesville alternate route

U.S. Route 64 Alternate (US 64A) was established in 1954, it replaced the old mainline US 64 through downtown Statesville.  In 1960 it was renumbered to US 64 Business.

Franklinville–Ramseur alternate route

U.S. Route 64 Alternate (US 64A) was established in 1941, it replaced the old mainline US 64 through Franklinville and Ramseur.  Around 1957, US 64A was downgraded to Andrew Hunter Road and part of NC 22.

Siler City alternate route

U.S. Route 64 Alternate (US 64A) was established in 1952, it replaced the old mainline US 64 through downtown Siler City, via 3rd Street.  By 1957 it was decommissioned.

Rocky Mount alternate route

U.S. Route 64 Alternate (US 64A) was established in 1934 as an alternate route in downtown Rocky Mount, via Thomas Avenue; while mainline US 64 used Sunset Avenue, Raleigh Street, and Tarboro Street.  It was absorbed by mainline US 64 by 1949.

Williamston alternate route

U.S. Route 64 Alternate (US 64A) was established in 1954, it replaced the old mainline US 64 through downtown Williamston, via Main Street, Haughton Street and Sycamore Street (now Jamesville Road).  In 1960 it was renumbered to US 64 Business.

Columbia alternate route

U.S. Route 64 Alternate (US 64A) was established in 1954, it replaced the old mainline US 64 through downtown Columbia, via Main Street.  In 1960 it was renumbered to US 64 Business.

Former business loops and spurs

Enid business loop

U.S. Route 64 Business (US 64 Bus) was established in 1967, replacing the old mainline US 64 through downtown Enid, via Rock Island Boulevard, Grand Avenue and Owen K. Garriott Road.  The business loop was decommissioned in 2009.

Rosman business loop

U.S. Route 64 Business (US 64 Bus) was established in 1979 when mainline US 64 was placed on new bypass north of Rosman.  However, this business loop designation lasted six months before being decommissioned in 1980; reason was because request to AASHTO was denied.  The routing followed US 178 into Rosman, then along Old Rosman Highway (SR 1388) to US 64, towards Brevard.

Statesville business loop

U.S. Route 64 Business (US 64 Bus) was established in 1960, as a renumbering of US 64A through downtown Statesville.  In 1963, mainline US 64 reverted to its original route through Statesville.

Raleigh business loop

U.S. Route 64 Business (US 64 Bus) was established around 1965 when mainline US 64 was placed on new freeway bypassing north of Raleigh.  The business route began at the Western Boulevard interchange with US 64/US 1 and proceeded east into the downtown area, where it became Boylan Avenue.  At Boylan/South intersection, US 64 turns right onto South Street, while NC 31 continues on along Boylan Avenue to Central Prison.  Between Saunders Street and East Street, US 64 splits with westbound on South Street and eastbound on Lenoir Street.  Continuing along East Street, it turns right onto New Bern Avenue then meeting back with US 64 at the beltline.  In 1971, US 64 was split between East Street and Idlewild Avenue, with westbound on New Bern Avenue and eastbound on Edenton Street.  In 1973, the split was extended further west from Idlewild Avenue to the Edenton Street / New Bern Avenue split.  In 1978, the business loop was decommissioned with its entire routing becoming secondary roads.

Tarboro–Princeville business loop

U.S. Route 64 Business (US 64 Bus) was established around 1968 when mainline US 64 was placed on new bypass east of Tarboro and south of Princeville; the business route followed the old alignment through both downtown areas via Main Street.  In 1994, US 64 was placed on new freeway south of Tarboro, making the business loop impracticable.  Majority of the business route was replaced by NC 33, with only the stretch between Western Boulevard and Northern Boulevard downgraded to secondary road.

Williamston business loop

U.S. Route 64 Business (US 64 Bus) was established in 1960 as a renumbering of US 64A through downtown Williamston, via Main Street, Haughton Street and Jamesville Road.  In 1977, it was decommissioned with Main Street and Jamesville Road downgraded to secondary road, while Haughton Street remained part of US 17 Bus.

References

External links

 NCRoads.com: U.S. 64-A
 NCRoads.com: U.S. 64 Business

64
64
U.S. Route 64
64
64
64